The United States District Court for the Southern District of Mississippi (in case citations, S.D. Miss.) is a federal court in the Fifth Circuit with facilities in Gulfport, Hattiesburg, Natchez, and Jackson.

Appeals from cases brought in the Southern District of Mississippi are taken to the United States Court of Appeals for the Fifth Circuit (except for patent claims and claims against the U.S. government under the Tucker Act, which are appealed to the Federal Circuit).

The United States Attorney for the Southern District of Mississippi represents the United States in civil and criminal litigation in the court.  the Acting United States Attorney is Darren LaMarca.

Counties under jurisdiction

Adams
Amite
Claiborne
Clarke
Copiah
Covington
Forrest
Franklin
George
Greene
Hancock
Harrison
Hinds
Holmes
Issaquena
Jackson
Jasper
Jefferson
Jefferson Davis
Jones
Kemper
Lamar
Lauderdale
Lawrence
Leake
Lincoln
Madison
Marion
Neshoba
Newton
Noxubee
Pearl River
Perry
Pike
Rankin
Scott
Sharkey
Simpson
Smith
Stone
Walthall
Warren
Wayne
Wilkinson
Yazoo

Current judges 
:

Former judges

Chief judges

Succession of seats

See also 
 Courts of Mississippi
 List of current United States district judges
 List of United States federal courthouses in Mississippi

Footnotes

Further reading
 David M. Hargrove, Mississippi's Federal Courts: A History. Jackson, MS: University Press of Mississippi, 2019.

External links 
 U.S. District Court for the Southern District of Mississippi

Mississippi, Southern District
Mississippi law
Biloxi, Mississippi
Hattiesburg, Mississippi
Vicksburg, Mississippi
Jackson, Mississippi
1838 establishments in Mississippi
Courthouses in Mississippi
Courts and tribunals established in 1838